Between Sky and Sea is a novel by Polish-born Australian writer Herz Bergner. It concerns a group of Jewish refugees sailing for Australia on a dilapidated ship.

The novel was published in 1946 by Dolphin Publications, translated from Yiddish to English by Judah Waten. It received the Australian Literature Society Gold Medal in 1948.

References

1946 Australian novels